Johnny Holiday (October 28, 1912 – February 28, 2009) was an American actor who entered the field of acting at the age of 87.

Biography
A former barkeep, Holiday (born John Taube) came out of a 25-year retirement, first appearing in print ads; later starting an acting career when he was nearly 90 years old. Taube was reportedly inspired by a photographer who told him that he would be great in film.

References

External links

1912 births
2009 deaths
American male film actors
American male television actors
Male actors from Los Angeles
Male actors from San Francisco
20th-century American male actors